The Mellowpark in Berlin is Europe's biggest outdoor sportpark for skateboarder and for BMX biker.

Details

History 
The "All 1" moved to an old cable factory in 1999 when its previous site at the "Allende Viertel" was redeveloped for housing. It was planned as a sports and teens project and won the 1999 & 2000 city contest "Teens Build the New Berlin" (Jugend entwicklet das neue Berlin). 

Mellowpark grew very fast and is now the biggest Outdoor Skaterpark in Europe. To the year 2008 the park was used by more than 20,000 people a year. The Youth Welfare Office sponsored Mellowpark with over €75,000 (USD $115,000) annually. The Berner Group, a private investor, bought the place next to Mellowpark and planned a project for loft apartments. The Berner Group wanted Mellowpark to be closed as few people would want to live next to a skatepark.

It was decided in June 2008, after two demonstrations and a year-long petition collection, the City of Berlin decided that Mellowpark would close on December 31, 2008. Later that month, the City of Berlin announced Mellowpark would be moved to a new location, opposite the football stadium of 1. FC Union Berlin and the river Spree, address: An der Wuhlheide.

The new Mellowpark was opened in August 2012 with the event "Highway to Hill 2012".

Events

Partners/Sponsors

See also 
 Sport in Berlin

References and notes

External links 
 Official Mellowpark Homepage (german)
 Official Mellowpark demonstration Homepage (german)

Skateparks in Germany
Sports venues in Berlin